Norman Parker (14 January 1908 – 27 April 1999) was an international speedway rider who rode in the inaugural Speedway World Championship in 1936 as a reserve.

Brief career summary
Born in Birmingham, England, Parker joined Coventry in 1929, and remained there until 1933 when he moved on to join the Southampton Saints. He then moved to Clapton Saints and then the Harringay Tigers. He and his older brother Jack rode in the same teams until the outbreak of war. In 1934 Parker made his international debut for England.

After the war Parker joined the Wimbledon Dons and was appointed captain. In 1948, he finished runner up in the Australian Championship. In 1949, he finished fourth in the Speedway World Championship and made his last World Final appearance in 1951.

World final appearances
 1936 -  London, Wembley Stadium - 18th - 1pt + 6 semi-final points
 1949 -  London, Wembley Stadium - 4th - 10pts
 1951 -  London, Wembley Stadium - 14th - 3pts

References

1908 births
1999 deaths
British speedway riders
English motorcycle racers
Coventry Bees riders
Harringay Racers riders
Wimbledon Dons riders
Southampton Saints riders